Alejandro Rizo Jr. (born 1968) is an American politician and former educator serving as a member of the Florida House of Representatives from the 110th district. He assumed office on November 3, 2020.

Early life and education 
Rizo was born in New York City and raised in Hialeah, Florida. After graduating from Hialeah Senior High School, he earned a Bachelor of Science degree in biological sciences from Florida International University and a Master of Science in educational leadership and administration from Nova Southeastern University.

Career 
From 1995 to 1998, Rizo was a teacher and coach at Barbara Goleman Senior High School. From 1998 to 2006, he was an administrator in the Miami-Dade County Public Schools. In 2006 and 2007, he was a sales representative for Houghton Mifflin Harcourt, assigned to the South Florida region. Since 2007, he has worked as an education consultant. He also served as a member of the Miami-Dade Board of County Commissioners. Rizo was elected to the Florida House of Representatives in November 2020. Rizo is a member of the House Health & Human Services Committee. In May 2021, he was appointed to the House Subcommittee on Gaming Regulation.

In 2021, Rizo proposed legislation that would make it a crime to film police officers within 30 feet.

References 

1968 births
People from New York City
People from Hialeah, Florida
Florida International University alumni
Nova Southeastern University alumni
Republican Party members of the Florida House of Representatives
Living people
Hispanic and Latino American state legislators in Florida
American politicians of Cuban descent